Battle of Salado may refer to:
Battle of Río Salado or Battle of Tarifa (1340), a battle of the armies of King Afonso IV of Portugal and King Alfonso XI of Castile against those of sultan Abu al-Hasan 'Ali of Morocco and Yusuf I of Granada
Battle of Salado Creek (1842), a decisive engagement in 1842 that repulsed the final Mexican invasion of the Republic of Texas